Republican Left can refer to different political parties:
 Republican Left (Italy)
 Republican Left (Spain)
 Republican Left (Spain, 1977)
 Republican Left of Catalonia
 Rally of Left Republicans (France)